Zuyar (also Romanized as Zūyār, Zūvār, and Zuwār; also known as Zovān) is a village in Eqbal-e Gharbi Rural District, in the Central District of Qazvin County, Qazvin Province, Iran. At the 2006 census, its population was 820, in 177 families.

References 

Populated places in Qazvin County